Aiken, Texas may refer to the following communities:

Aiken, Bell County, Texas 
Aiken, Floyd County, Texas 
Aiken, Shelby County, Texas